The Department of Environment and Forests of Arunachal Pradesh (DEFAP) is a state-sponsored agency responsible for conserving the environment, identifying, establishing, and conserving protected areas in the Indian state of Arunachal Pradesh.

Statistics
According to the official website, 10185.40 square kilometers are being protected by the agency. That's 12 percent of the total area of the state and 15 percent of the total forest cover in the state - 68045 square kilometers. There are 8715 species of plant life within Arunachal's forests, which contributes to the importance of wildlife reserves. Arunachal is a very rural state, most of the state being covered in forests, forest and wildlife protection is extremely important to the people living in Arunachal Pradesh.

Sanctuaries
There are a total of eight wildlife sanctuaries and one reserve protected by the Department of Environment and Forests:
Dibang Wildlife Sanctuary
Mehao Wildlife Sanctuary
Pakhui Tiger Reserve
Kamlang Wildlife Sanctuary
Eaglenest Wildlife Sanctuary
D'Ering Memorial Wildlife Sanctuary
Itanagar Wildlife Sanctuary
Sessa Orchid Wildlife Sanctuary
Kane Wildlife Sanctuary

See also
Wildlife sanctuaries of India
Protected area

References, sources, and citations

Government of Arunachal Pradesh
Environment of Arunachal Pradesh
Arunachal Pradesh
Year of establishment missing